Hemofiltration, also haemofiltration, is a renal replacement therapy which is used in the intensive care setting. It is usually used to treat acute kidney injury (AKI), but may be of benefit in multiple organ dysfunction syndrome or sepsis. During hemofiltration, a patient's blood is passed through a set of tubing (a filtration circuit) via a machine to a semipermeable membrane (the filter) where waste products and water (collectively called ultrafiltrate) are removed by convection. Replacement fluid is added and the blood is returned to the patient.

As in dialysis, in hemofiltration one achieves movement of solutes across a semi-permeable membrane. However, solute movement with hemofiltration is governed by convection rather than by diffusion. With hemofiltration, dialysate is not used. Instead, a positive hydrostatic pressure drives water and solutes across the filter membrane from the blood compartment to the filtrate compartment, from which it is drained.  Solutes, both small and large, get dragged through the membrane at a similar rate by the flow of water that has been engendered by the hydrostatic pressure.  Thus convection overcomes the reduced removal rate of larger solutes (due to their slow speed of diffusion) seen in hemodialysis.

Hemodiafiltration
Hemofiltration is sometimes used in combination with hemodialysis, when it is termed hemodiafiltration. Blood is pumped through the blood compartment of a high flux dialyzer, and a high rate of ultrafiltration is used, so there is a high rate of movement of water and solutes from blood to dialysate that must be replaced by substitution fluid that is infused directly into the blood line. However, dialysis solution is also run through the dialysate compartment of the dialyzer. The combination is theoretically useful because it results in good removal of both large and small molecular weight solutes.

Intermittent vs. continuous
These treatments can be given intermittently, or continuously.  The latter is usually done in an intensive care unit setting. There may be little difference in clinical and health economic outcome between the two in the context of acute kidney failure.

On-line intermittent hemofiltration (IHF) or hemodiafiltration (IHDF)
Either of these treatments can be given in outpatient dialysis units, three or more times a week, usually 3–5 hours per treatment.  IHDF is used almost exclusively, with only a few centers using IHF.  With both IHF or IHDF, the substitution fluid is prepared on-line from dialysis solution by running dialysis solution through a set of two membranes to purify it before infusing it directly into the blood line. In the United States, regulatory agencies have not yet approved on-line creation of substitution fluid because of concerns about its purity. For this reason, hemodiafiltration, had historically never been used in an outpatient setting in the United States.

Continuous hemofiltration or hemodiafiltration (CHDF)
Continuous hemofiltration (CHF) was first described in a 1977 paper by Kramer et al. as a treatment for fluid overload. Hemofiltration is most commonly used in an intensive care unit setting, where it is either given as 8- to 12-hour treatments, so called SLEF (slow extended hemofiltration), or as CHF (continuous hemofiltration), also sometimes called continuous veno-venous hemofiltration (CVVH) or continuous renal replacement therapy (CRRT). Hemodiafiltration (SLED-F or CHDF or CVVHDF) also is widely used in this fashion.  In the United States, the substitution fluid used in CHF or CHDF is commercially prepared, prepackaged, and sterile (or sometimes is prepared in the local hospital pharmacy), avoiding regulatory issues of on-line creation of replacement fluid from dialysis solution.

With slow continuous therapies, the blood flow rates are usually in the range of 100-200 ml/min, and access is usually achieved through a central venous catheter placed in one of the large central veins.  In such cases a blood pump is used to drive blood flow through the filter. Native access for hemodialysis (e.g. AV fistulas or grafts) are unsuitable for CHF because the prolonged residence of the access needles required might damage such accesses.

The length of time before the circuit clots and becomes unusable, often referred to as circuit life, can vary depending on the medication used to keep blood from clotting. Heparin and regional citrate are often used, though heparin carries a higher risk of bleeding. However, a comprehensive analysis of audit data from intensive care units in the UK revealed that, compared with heparin, citrate-based drugs were not associated with fewer deaths among patients with acute kidney injury after 90 days of treatment. Citrate-based drugs were, however, associated with a substantially higher cost of treatment.

See also
 Hemodialysis
 Renal replacement therapy
 Extracorporeal therapy
 Dialytrauma

References

Membrane technology
Nephrology procedures